James Norton (October 8, 1843 – October 14, 1920) was a U.S. Representative from South Carolina.

Born near Mullins, South Carolina, Norton pursued an academic course, then he left school in 1861 to enter the Confederate States Army.  He served throughout the Civil War in the Army of Northern Virginia.  After the war, Norton reentered school but did not finish the regular course.

He was a teacher in the public schools 1866-1870, and engaged in agricultural pursuits and merchandising.

Norton was elected county school commissioner in 1870 and reelected in 1872.  He served as a member of the Statehouse of representatives in 1886, 1887, 1890, and 1891.  He served as assistant comptroller general of South Carolina 1890-1894, then the actual comptroller general of the State from 1894 until 1897, when he resigned.

Norton was elected as a Democrat to the Fifty-fifth Congress to fill the vacancy caused by the resignation of John L. McLaurin.  He was re-elected to the Fifty-sixth Congress and served from December 6, 1897, to March 3, 1901.  He was not a candidate for reelection in 1900 to the Fifty-seventh Congress.

He resumed agricultural pursuits and also engaged in the real estate business.  He was again a member of the Statehouse of representatives in 1907-1908.

He died in Mullins, South Carolina, October 14, 1920.  He was interred in Miller's Churchyard.

Sources

References

1843 births
1920 deaths
Democratic Party members of the South Carolina House of Representatives
Confederate States Army personnel
Democratic Party members of the United States House of Representatives from South Carolina
People from Mullins, South Carolina